Rameshwarpalli is a village in Nizamabad district, in Telangana State.

Transport
The village is situated near National Highway 7 (India) Highway with connections to nearby towns and cities with regular buses and other modes of transportation.

References

Villages in Nizamabad district
Nizamabad district
Nizamabad, Telangana